Benign early repolarization also known as early repolarization (abbr.: BER) is found on ECG in about 1% of those with chest pain. It is diagnosed based on an elevated J-point / ST elevation with an end-QRS notch or end-QRS slur and where the ST segment concave up. It is believed to be a normal variant.

Benign early repolarization that occurs as some patterns is associated with ventricular fibrillation. The association, revealed by research performed in the late 2000s, is very small.

Types 
Benign early repolarization, very prevalent in younger people and healthy male athletes, can be divided into 3 subtypes:

 Type 1 – BER pattern seen in lateral precordial leads.
 Type 2 – BER pattern seen in inferior or inferolateral leads.
 Type 3 – BER pattern seen globally (inferior, lateral, right precordial leads).

Associations with serious conditions 
Research in the late 2000s has linked this finding when found as some patterns to ventricular fibrillation, particularly in those who have fainted or have a family history of sudden cardiac death. Although there is a significant relationship between ventricular fibrillation and some early repolarization's patterns, the overall lifetime occurrence of idiopathic ventricular fibrillation is exceptionally rare. There has also been an association between early repolarization and short QT syndrome.

Risk factors 

 Male gender
 J-point and horizontal or descending / downsloping ST segment (especially in inferior leads)
 Elevation of ST segment by 2 mm
 Elevation of a J-wave by 0.2 mV or more
 J-point distribution globally
 QRS longer than 110 ms
Longer duration of J wave, more than 60 ms

Electrocardiography
On an electrocardiogram (EKG or ECG), benign early repolarization may produce an elevation of the J-point and ST segment in 2 or more leads, similar to that observed in heart attacks (myocardial infarction). However, with benign early repolarization, the ST segment is usually concave up, rather than concave down (as with heart attacks), and there is a notable absence of reciprocal changes suggestive of ischemia on the EKG.

Causes 
It is thought the causing mechanism of early repolarization is a more excitable ion channel system, which causes a quicker myocardium contraction. Studies have shown that higher testosterone levels in males result in an increased outward potassium currents causing J point elevation.

Epidemiology
Benign early repolarization occurs in about 1 to 13 percent of the general population with a significant increase in occurrence within athletes and adolescents. In one study, an occurrence of early repolarization was observed in 31.6% of elite athletes while in another study occurrence was observed in 25.1% of athletes.

Being a male is strongly associated with early repolarization ECG pattern, and 70% of subjects with early repolarization are males. Prevalence of early repolarization declines in males from early adulthood until middle-age which could suggest a hormonal influence on its presence. Early repolarization patterns are more common in physically active younger individuals, athletes and Africans.

Genetics 
Genes associated with ER and ATP sensitive potassium current channel mutations are KCNJ8, ABCC9 Others associated with transient outward potassium current - KCNE5, DPP10, L-type voltage gated calcium current - CACNA1C, CACNB2B, CACNA2D1, sodium current - SCN5A, SCN10A.

History 
Early repolarization with ST segment elevation was first described in 1936 by R.A. Shipley and W.R. Hallaran in a study of 200 healthy 20–35 year old people.

References

Further reading

External links 
 Benign Early Repolarisation on litfl.com
 Early Repolarization – ECGpedia

Electrodiagnosis
Cardiac arrhythmia

fr:Repolarisation précoce